is a football (soccer) club based in Hachimantai, a city of Iwate Prefecture in Japan. They play in the Tohoku Soccer League, which is part of Japanese Regional Leagues. The name of the club refers to Mount Iwate, symbol of their prefecture due to this volcano and also present on the club's logo.

History
Founded in 2006, the club was a separated entity from Grulla Morioka (still in the Iwate Prefecture, but in Morioka). Shinichi Muto was fundamental to start club's history with the proper amount of experience and he was hired as player-manager for 2006 and 2007. The creation of another club in the Prefecture - Unsommet Iwate Hachimantai - didn't stop FC Ganju Iwate from climbing Japanese football's pyramid: they won several promotion in Iwate Prefectural Football, even going unbeaten for whole four seasons.

Unfortunately, then bigger clubs - like Grulla, ReinMeer Aomori FC and Vanraure Hachinohe - risked to block their growth. After these clubs went up to Japan Football League, FC Ganju Iwate won the Tohoku Soccer League in 2014 and 2015. Still, the club wasn't able to reach JFL because they didn't perform in 2014 and 2015 Japanese Regional Football League Competition, being eliminated in the group stage. They featured just once in Emperor's Cup, losing against Saitama SC in the first round of 2007 edition.

As for 2017 season, their aim remains to reach Japan Football League.

League record

Key
Pos. = Position in league; GP = Games played; W = Games won; D = Games drawn; L = Games lost; Pts = Points gained

Honours
Tohoku Soccer League
Champions (2) : 2014, 2015
Champions 
Iwate Prefecture (Div. 4) 2007
Iwate Prefecture (Div. 3) 2008
Iwate Prefecture (Div. 2) 2009
Iwate Prefecture (Div. 1) 2010
Tohoku Soccer League (Div. 2, North) 2012

Current squad

References

External links
Official Site (Japanese)

 
Football clubs in Japan
Sports teams in Iwate Prefecture
Hachimantai, Iwate
Association football clubs established in 2006
2006 establishments in Japan